Trombicula, known as chiggers, red bugs, scrub-itch mites, or berry bugs, are small arachnids (eight-legged arthropods) in the Trombiculidae family. In their larval stage, they attach to various animals, including humans, and feed on skin, often causing itching and trombiculosis.  These relatives of ticks are nearly microscopic, measuring 0.4 mm (0.01 in) and have a chrome-orange hue. A common species of harvest mite in North America is Trombicula alfreddugesi.

The larval mites feed on the skin cells, but not blood, of animals. The six-legged parasitic larva feeds on a large variety of creatures, including humans, rabbits, wallabies, toads, box turtles, quail, and even some insects. After crawling onto their hosts, they inject digestive enzymes into the skin that break down skin cells.  They do not actually "bite", but instead form a hole in the skin called a stylostome, and chew up tiny parts of the inner skin, thus causing severe irritation and swelling. The severe itching is accompanied by red pimple-like bumps (papules) or hives and skin rash or lesions on a sun-exposed area. For humans, itching usually occurs after the larvae detach from the skin.

After feeding on their hosts, the larvae drop to the ground and become nymphs, then mature into adults, which have eight legs and are harmless to humans. In the postlarval stage, they are not parasitic and feed on plant materials. The females lay three to eight eggs in a clutch, usually on a leaf or under the roots of a plant, and die by autumn.

Distribution

Species in the genus Trombicula are found throughout the world. In Europe and North America, they tend to dwell in hot and humid climates. In more temperate regions, they are found only in summer. (In France, for example, they are called aoûtat, after août, August; vendangeon, after vendange, harvest; or rouget, after rouge, red.) In the United States, they are found mostly in the southeast, the south, and the Midwest. They are rarely found in far northern areas, high mountains or deserts. They live in low, damp areas within forests and grasslands, as well as in drier environments places where vegetation is low-growing but profuse, such as lawns, golf courses and parks. They are most numerous in early summer when grass, weeds and other vegetation are most prevalent.  Harvest mites can also find their way into homes via human hosts who have passed through such areas.

Taxonomy
Species include:

See also
 Chigger bite
 Human parasite
 List of human parasites

References
  The World Book Encyclopedia, 2000 ed.
 Encyclopædia Britannica, 2005 ed. .

External links

 "Chiggers!" at Missouri Department of Conservation
 Iowa State University Department of Entomology Insect Information Note
 NIH Medline Plus
 Ohio State University Extension Fact Sheet, Entomology, Chiggers, HYG-2100-98
 Trombicula autmunalis

Trombiculidae